Detecon International GmbH is a German company specializing in management and technology consulting and operating at the international level. Its headquarters are in Cologne, and it is a subsidiary of T-Systems International GmbH.

History
Detecon International GmbH emerged from the merger of the consulting companies Detecon and Diebold on 1 August 2002. Diebold was founded by John Diebold in New York City in 1954. In 1959, Diebold opened the first branch offices in Germany. The first Swiss branch was established in 1986; at the same time, the consulting portfolio was expanded by the addition of business strategies and process re-engineering. In August 2012, Detecon moved its headquarters from Bonn to Cologne and new premises at Sternengasse 14-16.

In 1977, Detecon, previously operating under the name Deutsche Telepost Consulting, was founded to provide consulting services to the telecommunications industry. In view of the growing importance of IT and TC technologies in areas far beyond the narrow confines of actual telecommunications, Detecon has taken this expertise as its starting point to offer consulting services to clients from virtually all industries. Nevertheless, the focus of the company’s services remains on consulting and implementation solutions based on the use of information and communications technologies.

Locations
In addition to its Cologne headquarters, Detecon is represented at four other locations in Germany: Dresden, Frankfurt am Main, Berlin and Munich.

International branch offices are found in Abu Dhabi (UAE), Ankara (Turkey), Bratislava (Slovakia), Johannesburg (South Africa) and Warsaw (Poland). Subsidiaries are Detecon Asia-Pacific Ltd. in Bangkok (Thailand), Detecon Vezetési Tanácsadó Kft in Budapest (Hungary), Detecon Consulting FZ-LLC in Dubai (UAE), DETECON Consulting Co., Ltd. in Beijing (China), Detecon Inc. (USA) in San Francisco (United States), Detecon Consulting Austria GmbH in Vienna (Austria), and Detecon (Switzerland) AG in Zurich (Switzerland).

References

External links
http://www.detecon.com
https://www.detecon.com/en/About_Detecon/Locations

Information technology consulting firms of Germany
Deutsche Telekom